Democracy is a 1918 British silent war film directed by Sidney Morgan and starring Bruce Gordon, Queenie Thomas and Alice O'Brien.

Cast
 Bruce Gordon as George Greig  
 Queenie Thomas as Prudence 
 Alice O'Brien as Diana Tudworth 
 Frank Dane as Gerald Tudworth 
 Alice Russon as Rose Greig  
 Alice De Winton as Lady Tudworth  
 Wyndham Guise as Sutton Tudworth  
 Jack Andrews as Daniel Greig  
 Mrs. Hubert Willis as Mary Greig

References

Bibliography
 Low, Rachael. The History of British Film, Volume III: 1914-1918. Routledge, 1997.

External links
 

1918 films
British war drama films
British silent feature films
Films directed by Sidney Morgan
1910s war drama films
British World War I films
Films set in England
British black-and-white films
1918 drama films
1910s English-language films
1910s British films
Silent war drama films